Vodafone Idea (or Vi, and/but stylised as V!) is an Indian mobile network operator with its headquarters based in Mumbai and Gandhinagar. It is an all-India integrated GSM operator offering 2G, 3G, 4G, 4G+, VoLTE, and VoWiFi service. As of 31 December 2022, Vi has a subscriber base of 228.60 million, making it third largest mobile telecommunications network in India and 11th largest mobile telecommunications network in the world. The company was created on 31 August 2018 by the merger of Vodafone India and Idea Cellular, to form a new entity named Vodafone Idea Limited.

On 7 September 2020, Vodafone Idea unveiled its new brand identity, 'Vi' which involves the integration of the company's erstwhile separate brands 'Vodafone' and 'Idea' into one unified brand.

On 3 February 2023, Government of India approved and ordered the company to convert its AGRs Interest due worth Rs.16100 Crore to equity at the rate of Rs.10/- Share, Thus making the Government of India as the single biggest shareholder in the cash strapped company  in a call to give it a lifeline and prevent telecom market from turning into duopoly.

Government agreed upon the conversion only after promoters agreed on infusing more capital in the company and government also said it will look for an exit when share price reaches Rs.10 or above.

History
Announced in March 2017 that Idea Cellular and Vodafone India would merge. The merger got approval from the Department of Telecommunications in July 2018. On 30 August 2018, National Company Law Tribunal gave the final nod to the Vodafone-Idea merger  The merger was completed on 31 August 2018, and the newly merged entity was named Vodafone Idea Limited. The merger created the largest telecom company in India by subscribers and by revenue. Under the terms of the deal, the Vodafone Group holds a 45.2% stake in the combined entity, the Aditya Birla Group holds 26% and the remaining shares will be held by the public. Vi lost a significant number of gross and active subscribers in the month of August 2020 after the merger.

Until 7 September 2020, Vodafone Idea Limited operated two separate brands: Vodafone and Idea who both operated pre-paid and post-paid GSM service.

Vi also provides services including Mobile payments, IoT, enterprise offerings and entertainment, accessible via both digital channels as well as on-ground touch points, centres across the country. Vi has a broadband network of 340,000 sites, distribution reach of 1.7 million retail outlets.

, data published by the telecom regulator TRAI Vi had the highest upload speed of 28 Mbps.

Network

Spectrum frequency holding summary
Vi owns spectrum in 900 MHz, 1800 MHz, 2100 MHz, 2300 MHz, 2500 MHz, 3500 MHz and 26 GHz bands across the country.

This table contains Vi (Vodafone & Idea) radio frequency details because they had integrated their networks with each other and using one anchor network for both brands in all respective telecom circles. For example, Idea has started 4G services in Delhi and Kolkata telecom circle from May 2018 where the Vodafone is anchor network vice versa Vodafone has Started 4G services in Madhya Pradesh & Chhattisgarh, Bihar & Jharkhand, Andhra Pradesh & Telangana, Himachal Pradesh and Jammu and Kashmir telecom Circle's where Idea is Anchor network.

Network consolidation 

By March 2019, Vi announced its network consolidation across major circles, easing network issues faced by consumers and also enhancing its 4G coverage. Announcements of Network Consolidation were made as below

Enhanced Unified (2G, 3G, and 4G) coverage details

Enhanced LTE (4G) coverage details

Rajasthan network consolidation

Vi announced the successful consolidation of its radio network integration in Rajasthan service area. With this, Rajasthan is amongst the first eleven circles to complete integration in the world's largest network integration exercise which is currently underway in India.

According to the telecom regulator's data, the pan India wireless subscriber base of Vodafone Idea at the end of March 2019 stood at 394.8 million. The statement on network consolidation in Punjab, said 4G services have been enhanced for both Vodafone and Idea customers in cities including Chandigarh, Ludhiana, Amritsar, Jalandhar, Patiala, Bathinda, Moga, and Hoshiarpur. And in Rajasthan Jaipur, Jodhpur, Bikaner, Kota, Ajmer, Udaipur among others.

Massive MIMO 
Vi deployed technologies such as massive MIMO, small cells, TDD sites to enhance coverage and network capacity in Mumbai and Delhi during March. As part of the modernisation exercise, the company deployed more than 5000 massive MIMO, small cells and TDD sites across Churchgate, Prabhadevi, Pali Hill, Lokhandwala, Versova, Andheri, Jogeshwari, Bandra and Dadar among other regions in Mumbai. The company also deployed more than 4,000 Massive Mimo, small cells and TDD sites across the New Delhi and NCR region.

Giga-Net 
Vi has launched "Giganet" 4G services in select cities of Uttar Pradesh, Rajasthan, Karnataka and Rest of Bengal (including Kolkata) circles. The launch of Giganet 4G follows the consolidation of its radio network integration and the deployment of technologies such as Dynamic Spectrum Re-farming (DSR), Spectrum Re-farming, M-MIMO, L900, TDD, and Small Cells to further boost network capacity and coverage across large parts of the country.

Wifi Hotspot
Vi Provides wifi hotspot services in major cities Mumbai, Pune and Bangalore with over 200 locations. It is available for all Vi brand customers

Subsidiaries

YOU Broadband
YOU Broadband (wholly owned subsidiary of Vodafone Idea) offers fixed line broadband (FTTH) and voice services (VoIP) in major cities of India which includes Ahmedabad, Aurangabad, Bangalore, Chennai, Gurgaon, Hyderabad, Kakinada, Mumbai, Nagpur, Nashik, Navi Mumbai, Navsari, Powai, Pune, Rajkot, Surat, Thane, Vadodara, Valsad, Vapi, Vijayawada and Visakhapatnam.

See also 

 Vodafone
 Aditya Birla Group
 Telecommunications in India
 List of telecom companies in India
 List of mobile network operators

References

External links 
 

Companies based in Mumbai
Telecommunications companies of India
Axiata
Aditya Birla Group
Mobile phone companies of India
Private equity portfolio companies
Providence Equity Partners companies
Internet service providers of India
Indian companies established in 1995
Telecommunications companies established in 1995
Indian brands
Former AT&T subsidiaries
Former Tata Group subsidiaries
Companies listed on the National Stock Exchange of India
Companies listed on the Bombay Stock Exchange